Speaker of the House of Representatives of Antigua and Barbuda is the presiding officer in the House of Representatives of Antigua and Barbuda. The speaker's annual salary is XCD 60,000.

Speakers of the Legislative Council

Speakers of the House of Representatives

Sources

Politics of Antigua and Barbuda
Antigua and Barbuda
Antigua and Barbuda
Lists of Antigua and Barbuda people
Antigua and Barbuda politics-related lists